The Lake City Historic Commercial District is a U.S. historic district (designated as such on June 6, 1994) located in Lake City, Florida. The district is bounded by Railroad, North Hernando, Duval and North Columbia Streets. It contains 47 historic buildings and 1 structure.

References

External links

 Columbia County listings at National Register of Historic Places

Geography of Columbia County, Florida
Historic districts on the National Register of Historic Places in Florida
Lake City, Florida
National Register of Historic Places in Columbia County, Florida
1994 establishments in Florida